There have been two baronetcies created for persons with the surname Boothby, both in the Baronetage of England. One creation is extant as of 2022.

 
The Boothby Baronetcy, of Broadlow Ash in the County of Derby, was created in the Baronetage of England on 13 July 1660 for William Boothby, subsequently High Sheriff of Derbyshire from 1661 to 1662. Charles I had intended to create Boothby's father, Henry Boothby (1594–1648), a Royalist, in 1644 (with the territorial designation "of Clate Clote in the County of Oxford"). The letters patent received the sign-manual of the King but in the confusion of the Civil War, it did not pass the Great Seal. His son, William, petitioned for a new creation in 1660 which was granted (due to this the Baronets are sometime numbered differently, the first Baronet of the 1660 creation is sometimes referred to as the second Baronet, and so on). Sir William married as his second wife Hill, daughter of Sir William Brooke, hence the common family first name of Brooke. Sir William Brooke was heir to the barony of Cobham through his mother, but did not succeed as the peerages were under attainder. On his death the peerage fell into abeyance among his four daughters. Boothby was succeeded by his grandson Henry (son of his deceased son Francis from his first marriage to Frances Milward of Snitterton Hall).

The Boothbys left Broadlow Ash when the first Baronet purchased Ashbourne Hall from Sir Aston Cockayne in about 1671.
 
Several other members of this family may also be mentioned. Hill Boothby was born in 1708 and she was a daughter of Brooke Boothby (died 1708) and Elizabeth Fitzherbert, and she was a friend of Samuel Johnson. William Osbert Boothby (1866–1913), son of Reverend Evelyn Boothby, second son of Reverend Charles Boothby, third son of the seventh Baronet, was a captain in the Royal Navy. Basil Boothby, son of Basil Tanfield Beridge Boothby, youngest son of the aforementioned Reverend Evelyn Boothby, was a diplomat and served as Ambassador to Iceland from 1962 to 1965. Evelyn Leonard Beridge Boothby (1876–1937), son of Colonel Basil Charles Boothby (who was seriously wounded at the Battle of Alma during the Crimean War and had to have his leg amputated), fourth son of Reverend Charles Boothby (who at a young age fought in the Battle of Talavera where he lost a leg and was taken prisoner by the French), third son of the seventh Baronet, was also a captain in the Royal Navy. John George Boothby (1824–1876), third son of Reverend Brooke Boothby, second son of the seventh Baronet, was a major-general in the Royal Artillery.

The Boothby Baronetcy, of Friday Hill in the parish of Chingford in the County of Essex, was created in the Baronetage of England on 9 November 1660 for Thomas Boothby. The title became extinct on the early death of his son, Thomas, the second Baronet, in 1669.

Boothby baronets, of Clater Cote (1644)
Sir Henry Boothby, 1st Baronet (1594–1648)

Boothby baronets, of Broadlow Ash (1660)
Sir William Boothby, 1st Baronet (–1707)
Sir Henry Boothby, 2nd Baronet (1682–1710). He died unmarried at the age of eighteen.
Sir William Boothby, 3rd Baronet (1664–1731). Half-uncle, son of the first Baronet by his second marriage to the aforementioned Mary Hill.
Sir William Boothby, 4th Baronet (1721–1787). Grandson. He was a general in the British Army. He would have succeeded to the barony of Cobham but for the Brooke attainders.
Sir Brooke Boothby, 5th Baronet (1710–1789). First cousin once removed.  He was the eldest son of Brooke Boothby, third son of the second marriage of the first Baronet.
Sir Brooke Boothby, 6th (or 7th) Baronet (1744–1824). He was a poet and friend of Jean-Jacques Rousseau. He was famously painted in a Romantic pose by Joseph Wright in 1781 (see external links below).
Sir William Boothby, 7th Baronet (1746–1824). Brother.
Sir William Boothby, 8th Baronet (1782–1846). He was Receiver General of Customs at the Port of London.
Sir Brooke William Robert Boothby, 9th Baronet (1809–1865). He was Rector of Elmley, Worcestershire, and of Welwyn, Hertfordshire. Ashbourne Hall, Derbyshire, the family seat for 200 years, was sold according to his will.
Sir Brooke Boothby, 10th Baronet (1856–1913). He was a diplomat who was appointed envoy to Chile in 1907, but was unable to take up the post because of ill health.
Sir Charles Francis Boothby, 11th Baronet (1858–1926). Brother.
Sir Herbert Cecil Boothby, 12th Baronet (1863–1935). Brother.
Sir Seymour William Brooke Boothby, 13th Baronet (1866–1951). Brother.
Sir Hugo Robert Brooke Boothby, 14th Baronet (1907–1986). He served as Lord-Lieutenant of South Glamorgan from 1974 to 1986.
Sir Brooke Charles Boothby, 15th Baronet (born 1949)

The heir presumptive is the present holder's kinsman: George William Boothby (born 1948). He is descended from Reverend Brooke Boothby, second son of the seventh Baronet. He is married with three daughters.

Boothby baronets, of Friday Hill (1660)
 Sir Thomas Boothby, 1st Baronet (–1661)
 Sir Thomas Boothby, 2nd Baronet (–1669)

References

"Sir Brooke Boothby: Rousseau's Roving Baronet Friend" Aston English Historical Review. 2006; CXXI: 1543–1544.
Leigh Rayment. . Retrieved 14 January 2008.
Kidd, Charles, Williamson, David (editors). Debrett's Peerage and Baronetage (1990 edition). New York: St Martin's Press, 1990,

Further reading
 Jacques Zonneveld. Sir Brooke Boothby: Rousseau's Roving Baronet Friend. De Nieuwe Haagsche: Uitgeverij, 2003. Pp. 542. $105. Review by JoLynn Edwards available online.

External links
 Boothby genealogy Stirnet database, no date. Retrieved 14 January 2008.
 Portraits of Sir Brooke Boothby, 7th Bt. (or 6th Bt.) in the National Portrait Gallery

1644 establishments in England
Baronetcies in the Baronetage of England
Extinct baronetcies in the Baronetage of England